Parrésia, also Parrésia Publishers Ltd, is a publishing company in Nigeria founded by Azafi Omoluabi Ogosi and Richard Ali in 2012 with the aim of selling books to the Nigerian reading audience and promote the freedom of the imagination and the free press. It was described in 2017 by The New York Times as one of "a handful of influential new publishing houses" in Africa in the last decade.

Character 
Parrésia publishes its fiction and creative non-fiction works under four imprints: Parrésia Books, Origami Books, Cordite, and Omode Meta.

Parrésia Books is a traditional publishing imprint that publishes five books each year — literary fiction, popular fiction and short-story collections. The Parrésia imprint, being a traditional publisher, offers advances on royalties for first-time authors. All responsibilities are borne by the publisher.

Origami Books is a specialised publishing imprint which publishes work in all genres. The author takes full control of the book production process. 

Cordite Books is a new, traditional-style publishing company for genre fiction based in Lagos, Nigeria, and is jointly owned by Parrésia Publishers Ltd and Nigerian writer Helon Habila who is also a professor of Creative Writing at George Mason University in the United States. Habila is the editor for the series.

Ọmọde Mẹta is a traditional publishing imprint that publishes children’s books for all children ages and in all genres.

Authors 
 Helon Habila, winner of the Caine Prize and Commonwealth Writers' Prize for Fiction. His  novel Oil on Water was shortlisted for the Orion Environmental Book Award and Pen/Opera Book Award in 2012. Oil on Water was also nominated for the Best Novel Commonwealth Writers' Prize Africa Region in 2011. 
 Chika Unigwe (winner of NLNG Prize 2012)
 Abubakar Adam Ibrahim (winner of LNG Prize 2016 for Season of Crimson Blossoms, published by Parrésia Books in 2015). 
 Ogaga Ifowodo, whose poetry collection A Good Mourning was shortlisted for NLNG Prize in 2017
 Pius Adesanmi, a Nigerian columnist and professor at Carleton University in Canada.

References

External links
Official website

2006 establishments in Nigeria
Book publishing companies of Nigeria